Deroplatys sarawaca is a species of praying mantis in the family Deroplatyidae. It is native to Borneo, including in Sarawak Province of Malaysia on the island. The holotype female is stored in the OUMNH collections.

See also

List of mantis genera and species

References

sarawaca
Mantodea of Southeast Asia
Insects of Borneo
Insects of Indonesia
Insects of Malaysia
Sarawak
Insects described in 1889
Taxa named by John O. Westwood